Romulus Chihaia (born 4 March 1952) is a former Romanian professional footballer and manager. He is the father of Octavian Chihaia.  He won the Universiade gold medal with Romania's students football team in the 1974 edition that was held in France, playing alongside László Bölöni, Gheorghe Mulțescu, Dan Păltinișanu and Paul Cazan.

References

External links
 
 

1952 births
Living people
Romanian footballers
Romanian football managers
Sportspeople from Galați
ASC Oțelul Galați players
FCM Dunărea Galați players
FC Sportul Studențesc București players
Liga I players
FC Sportul Studențesc București managers
FC Progresul București managers
Association football midfielders
Romania international footballers